"Your Love" is a 1975 single by Graham Central Station, written by Larry Graham.  The single went to number one for one week and peaked at thirty-eight on the pop singles chart and was the group's only top 40 entry.

References

1975 songs
1975 singles
Song articles with missing songwriters